Young, Black, Rich and Famous is the third album by the rap artist, producer and songwriter M-Doc.

The set felt somewhere between rap and R&B, and its ambitions were probably best realized on the lead single, which was a cover of the Deniece Williams' number one hit from 1977 "Free" M-Doc's version of the song released as the lead single scored minor chart success on the U.S. Hot R&B/Hip-Hop Singles, where it peaked at number sixty-one in 1998.

To the album contributed several other performers. Among them, the singer CeCe Peniston (on the track "Keep It Real"), with whom M-Doc collaborated on the singles produced for her ("Searchin'", "I'm Not Over You" and "He Loves Me 2").

Track listing

Credits and personnel
 M-Doc - lead vocal, writer, producer, co-producer, executive producer, programming
 Jessie Campbell - lead vocal
 Cristina - lead vocal, back vocal
 Rhyme - back vocal
 CeCe Peniston - back vocal
 Shorty Gage - additional rap vocal
 Greg Gibbs - additional back vocal
 Blah Zae Blah - vocal
 D.A. Smart - vocal, writer
 Twista - vocal
 L.Smith - writer

 K.Little - writer
 Elroy Smith - writer
 T.Armstrong - writer
 R.Smith-also Furious 5 - writer
 Tanjila Pettis - writer
 S.Robinson - writer
 Ernest Wilson - writer
 Deniece Williams - writer
 Nathan Watts - writer
 Susaye Green - writer
 Henry Redd - writer
 Fredrick J. Taerrin - writer
 Richard Rudolph - writer
 Minnie Riperton - writer
 Scott Hammond - writer
 Persan Love - writer
 C.Mitchell - writer
 T.Parker - writer
 Lemoyne Alexander - instruments, producer
 Ant Dub - vocal producer

 N.O.I.D. - producer
 T.J. - producer
 Jere MC - producer
 C-Breeze - producer, writer
 Keith Henderson - guitar
 Ronnie Tyson - piano, Rhodes keyboards, guitar, back vocal, additional producer
 Lamar Jones - bass
 Steve Maestro - scratches
 Steve Weeder - engineer
 Steve Johnson - assistant engineer
 Matt Prock - mix
 Larry Sturm - mix
 Joey "The Don" Donatello - mix
 Ed Strickland - associate executive producer
 FPD3 and Jeff Weese - art direction, design
 Indasoul Songs (ASCAP) - publisher
 Alexia Music (Broadcast Music Incorporated) - publisher
 Nydrin Music (Broadcast Music Incorporated) - publisher
 Exactly Different (ASCAP) - publisher

References 

General

Specific

External links 
 
 

1998 albums